is a former Japanese football player and manager. He played for Japan national team. He also managed Japan national team.

Club career
Ninomiya was born in Tokyo on February 13, 1937. After graduating from Keio University, he joined Mitsubishi Motors in 1959. In 1965, Mitsubishi Motors joined new league Japan Soccer League. He retired in 1968. He played 45 games and scored 8 goals in the league.

National team career
On December 25, 1958, when Ninomiya was a Keio University student, he debuted for Japan national team against Hong Kong. In 1959, he played 9 games and scored 9 goals as a regular player. He played 12 games and scored 9 goals for Japan until 1961.

Coaching career
In 1967, Ninomiya played for Mitsubishi Motors, he became a playing manager as Tomohiko Ikoma successor and managed until 1975. In 9 seasons, the club won the champions 2 times (1969 and 1973) and 2nd place 4 times. The club also 1971 and 1973 Emperor's Cup. After Japan national team failed to qualify for 1976 Summer Olympics in April 1976, Ninomiya became a manager for Japan national team as Ken Naganuma successor. Ninomiya managed at 1978 World Cup qualification and 1978 Asian Games. He resigned after 1978 Asian Games.

In 2015, Ninomiya was selected Japan Football Hall of Fame.

National team statistics

References

External links
 
 Japan National Football Team Database
Japan Football Hall of Fame at Japan Football Association

1937 births
Living people
Keio University alumni
Japanese footballers
Japan international footballers
Japan Soccer League players
Urawa Red Diamonds players
Japanese football managers
Japan national football team managers
Association football forwards